Chebel is a surname. Notable people with the surname include:

Fadi Abou Chebel (born 1969), Maronite Exarch (Maronite Catholic Apostolic Exarchate of Colombia)
Malek Chebel (1953–2016), Algerian philosopher and anthropologist of religions

See also
Ouled Chebel, a town and commune in Algiers Province, Algeria